St. Anne-Pacelli Catholic School is named for Saint Anne, the mother of the Virgin Mary, and Pope Pius XII (Eugenio Pacelli). The school's history stretches back to 1868. Located in Columbus, Georgia, St. Anne-Pacelli is the only Preschool (age 1)-12th grade Catholic school serving southwestern Georgia.

History
In 1868, the Sisters of Mercy purchased a home in Downtown Columbus, Georgia and converted it into a convent. St. Joseph's Academy, a K–8 school, was formed at the same location in 1868. The school remained in Downtown Columbus until 1952, when population growth led to the establishment of a new Catholic school near Midtown Columbus. St. Joseph's then merged with this school.

Until St. Anne Church was built in 1961, the school operated under the name Holy Family School, and was operated by the Church of the Holy Family. The name was then changed to St. Anne School. In 2008, it was joined with Pacelli High School.

Athletics
Physical development is part of the mission of St. Anne-Pacelli Catholic School, and we are proud of our strong athletic program! Students are encouraged to participate and have an opportunity to play a sport in every season of the academic year. St. Anne-Pacelli Catholic School's athletic program begins in elementary school, as young as third grade. Middle and high school athletes compete in 14 sports.

At the varsity level, St. Anne-Pacelli competes as a Single A member of the Georgia High School Association (GHSA). More than 84 percent of our middle and high school students participate in at least one sport. Over the past five years, 30 athletes signed to play sports at the collegiate level in six different sports. St. Anne-Pacelli was honored with the 2016 GHSA Cooperative Spirit Sportsmanship Award.

The following sports programs are available for students:
Baseball: grades 6-12;
Boys' Basketball: grades 1-12;
Boys' Cross Country: grades 5-12;
Boys' Football: grades 6-12;
Boys' Golf: grades 5-12;
Boys' Soccer: grades 6-12;
Boys' Swimming: grades 6-12;
Boys' Tennis: grades 3-12;
Boys' Track and Field: grades 8-12;
Boys' and Bigger Dudes' Wrestling: grades 6-12.

References

External links
 School website

See also
 Pacelli High School (Columbus, Georgia)

Educational institutions established in 1868
Private middle schools in Georgia (U.S. state)
Private elementary schools in Georgia (U.S. state)
1868 establishments in Georgia (U.S. state)